KMSN (104.1 FM) is a radio station licensed to serve the community of Mason, Texas. The station is owned by Township Media, LLC. It airs an Americana radio format focused on Texas artists.

The station was assigned the KMSN call letters by the Federal Communications Commission on December 22, 2015.

References

External links
 Official Website
 

MSN (FM)
Radio stations established in 2019
2019 establishments in Texas
Americana radio stations
Mason County, Texas